F (F-sharp; also known as fa dièse or fi) is the seventh semitone of the solfège.

It lies a chromatic semitone above F and a diatonic semitone below G, thus being enharmonic to sol bémol or G (G-flat).  However, in some temperaments, it is not the same as G.  G is a major third below B, whereas F is a major third above D (a minor third below A). Another enharmonic note is E (E-double sharp).

When calculated in equal temperament with a reference of A above middle C as 440 Hz, the frequency of the F above middle C (or F4) is approximately 369.994 Hz. See pitch (music) for a discussion of historical variations in frequency.

Designation by octave

Scales

Common scales beginning on F
 F major: F G A B C D E F
 F natural minor: F G A B C D E F
 F harmonic minor: F G A B C D E F
 F melodic minor ascending: F G A B C D E F
 F melodic minor descending: F E D C B A G F

Diatonic scales
 F Ionian: F G A B C D E F
 F Dorian: F G A B C D E F
 F Phrygian: F G A B C D E F
 F Lydian: F G A B C D E F
 F Mixolydian: F G A B C D E F
 F Aeolian: F G A B C D E F
 F Locrian: F G A B C D E F

Jazz melodic minor
 F ascending melodic minor: F G A B C D E F
 F Dorian ♭2: F G A B C D E F
 F Lydian augmented: F G A B C D E F
 F Lydian dominant: F G A B C D E F
 F Mixolydian ♭6: F G A B C D E F
 F Locrian ♮2: F G A B C D E F
 F altered: F G A B C D E F

See also
 Piano key frequencies
 F-sharp major
 F-sharp minor

Musical notes